The Singles is a six themed EP by Mike Oldfield. It was only released as a 12" vinyl in Japan in 1981.

Track listing 
 "The William Tell Overture" (Rossini, arrangement Oldfield) – 3:55
 "Blue Peter" (Oldfield) – 2:07
 "Polka" (Traditional, arrangement Oldfield) – 3:38
 "Cuckoo Song" (Praetorius) – 3:13
 "Pipe Tune" (Oldfield) – 3:23
 "Portsmouth" (Traditional, arrangement Oldfield) – 2:04

References 

Mike Oldfield albums
1981 EPs
Virgin Records EPs